Calaveras Lake is a reservoir on Calaveras Creek, located 20 miles (32 kilometers) southeast of Downtown San Antonio, Texas, USA.  The reservoir was formed in 1969 by the construction of a dam to provide a cooling pond for a series of power plants, called the Calaveras Power Station, to supply additional electricity to the city of San Antonio.

The dam and lake are managed by CPS Energy of San Antonio.  Together with the smaller Victor Braunig Lake, Calaveras Lake was one of the first projects in the nation to use treated wastewater for power plant cooling.  The reservoir is partly filled with wastewater that has undergone both primary and secondary treatment at a San Antonio Water System treatment plant.  Calaveras Lake also serves as a venue for recreation, including fishing and boating. Sailboats are prohibited on the lake.

Fish and plant life
Calaveras Lake has been stocked with many species of fish for recreational fishing. Fish present in Calaveras Lake include red drum, hybrid striped bass, catfish, largemouth bass.

Recreational uses
Thousand Trails Management Services operates the 147 acre (57 ha) public facility under contract with CPS Energy at the lake.  The lake features facilities for camping, picknicking, fishing, boating, and hiking.

In popular culture
Calaveras Lake is the setting of one of the culminating scenes in the 1996 film Courage Under Fire, during which Matt Damon's character reveals his knowledge of the truth regarding the death of the character of Captain Karen Walden, the investigation of which constitutes the subject of the film up to that point.

See also 

 List of lakes in Texas

References

External links 
Calaveras Lake - Texas Parks & Wildlife
 Calaveras Lake power plant complex pollution: monthly, annual, and daily (near real-time) reports from the Texas Commission on Environmental Quality (TCEQ)

Calaveras
Geography of San Antonio
Protected areas of Bexar County, Texas
Bodies of water of Bexar County, Texas
Cooling ponds
CPS Energy